5α-Dihydroaldosterone is a metabolite of aldosterone that is formed by 5α-reductase. It is a potent antinatriuretic agent similarly to but somewhat different from aldosterone. It is produced in the kidneys.

References

Aldehydes
Diketones
Diols
Mineralocorticoids
Pregnanes